Frank Power may refer to:
 Frank Power (politician)
 Frank Power (basketball)